Frank Orren Lowden (January 26, 1861 – March 20, 1943) was an American Republican Party politician who served as the 25th Governor of Illinois and as a United States Representative from Illinois. He was also a candidate for the Republican presidential nominations in 1920 and 1928.

Born in Sunrise Township, Minnesota, Lowden practiced law in Chicago after graduating from the University of Iowa. He emerged as a local Republican leader and served in the House of Representatives from 1906 to 1911. He served as Governor of Illinois from 1917 to 1921, earning wide notice for his reorganization of state government and his handling of the Chicago race riot of 1919.

At the 1920 Republican National Convention, Lowden was the preferred candidate of many of the party's conservatives. His supporters coalesced behind Warren G. Harding as a compromise candidate, and Harding won both the nomination and the 1920 presidential election. Lowden was nominated for vice president at the 1924 Republican National Convention, but he declined the nomination. Lowden was a candidate for president at the 1928 Republican National Convention, but Herbert Hoover won the nomination on the first ballot.

Early life
Lowden was born in Sunrise Township, Minnesota, the son of Nancy Elizabeth (Breg) and Lorenzo Orren Lowden, a blacksmith. He lived in Iowa from the age of seven, on the farm in Hardin County, Iowa, in poverty. He attended school when chores on the family farm allowed.  At age fifteen he began to teach in a one room school house in Hubbard, Iowa.  
After teaching five years, he entered the University of Iowa at twenty, graduating in 1885. 
He aspired to be a lawyer, but taught high school for a year while learning stenography. 
That skill got him a job in 1886 at the Dexter law firm in Chicago, and he took evening courses at the 
Union College of Law, completing the two year curriculum in one year, finishing as valedictorian  in 1887. He was admitted to the bar the same year and practiced law in Chicago for about 20 years. His wife, Florence, was the daughter of George Pullman. In 1899, he was professor of law at Northwestern University, Evanston, Illinois.

Political career

In 1900, Lowden declined the first assistant postmaster-generalship, offered him by President McKinley, whom he had supported. He was a delegate to the Republican National Convention in 1900 and 1904, and from 1904 to 1912 was a member of the Republican National Committee. He was also a member of the executive committee in 1904 and 1908. Lowden was elected a U.S. Representative from Illinois in 1906 to fill the unexpired term of Robert R. Hitt, deceased. He was re-elected for succeeding terms until 1911, when he declined to run for another term.

From 1917 to 1921, he was the Governor of Illinois. While governor, he won wide notice for the major reorganization of state government he spearheaded. He introduced the budget system for state expenditure, thereby reducing the rate of taxation in spite of rising prices. He was a strong supporter of the death penalty, and when in 1918 both houses of the Illinois General Assembly voted to abolish capital punishment, he vetoed the bill. He was energetic in marshalling the resources of his state in support of the United States' World War I effort. In 1917, when the mayor of Chicago refused to interfere with a meeting of the People's Council, an organization accused of pro-Germanism, he ordered out the state troops to prevent the meeting. He favoured woman suffrage and the enforcement of the Volstead Act for war-time prohibition. He was opposed to the League of Nations without reservations, on the ground that it would create a super-state. He gained nationwide stature for his handling of the Chicago Race Riot of 1919 and a simultaneous transit strike in Chicago.

He was a leading candidate for the Republican nomination for president in 1920.  His campaign was embarrassed by reports of profligate spending.  His Missouri campaign manager gave out $32,000 to promote his campaign, including $2,500 (a laborer's annual wage) to at least two convention delegates.  Delegates at the Republican convention deadlocked over several ballots between Lowden and General Leonard Wood, resulting in party leaders meeting privately to determine a compromise candidate. Their choice, Warren G. Harding, went on to win the nomination. In the 1924 election, he declined the Republican nomination for vice president. In 1928, he again positioned himself to run for the party's nomination, but he was never much more than a minor threat to front runner Herbert Hoover, who went on to win the presidential nomination and the election.

Railroad career

In 1933, Lowden was appointed to be one of three receivers for the bankrupt Chicago, Rock Island and Pacific Railroad. He served in this capacity with co-receivers Joseph B. Fleming and James E. Gorman (the latter had been president of the railroad since 1917) until his death in 1943 in Tucson, Arizona. His remains are buried in Graceland Cemetery, Chicago.

Legacy
The following are named after Lowden: Camp Lowden Boy Scout Camp, Lowden State Park and Lowden-Miller State Forest, all near his estate outside Oregon, Illinois; the Frank O. Lowden Homes in Chicago; and two Lowden Halls, located on the campus of the Northwestern University School of Law in Chicago and Northern Illinois University in DeKalb.

Notes

Bibliography

External links

 

|-

|-

|-

|-

1861 births
1943 deaths
20th-century American politicians
Schoolteachers from Iowa
Burials at Graceland Cemetery (Chicago)
Farmers from Iowa
Republican Party governors of Illinois
Illinois lawyers
People from Chisago County, Minnesota
People from Hardin County, Iowa
Northwestern University faculty
Northwestern University Pritzker School of Law alumni
Republican Party members of the United States House of Representatives from Illinois
Candidates in the 1920 United States presidential election
Candidates in the 1928 United States presidential election
University of Iowa alumni